The O'Kennedy family (Irish: Ó Cinnéide), sometimes Kennedy, were an Irish royal dynasty, a sept of the Dál gCais, founded in the Middle Ages who were Kings of Ormond. Their founder was the nephew of High King Brian Boru (1002–1014). The name Cinnéide belonged to Brian Boru's father Cennétig mac Lorcáin, King of Thomond, in the tenth century AD. (Brian Boru was an Ard Rí or High King of Ireland). The Kennedys did not descend directly from Brian Boru, but from Cinnéide's eldest son Donncuan. Donncuan's son Mahon was the first to call himself Ó Cinnéide which is Irish for grandson of Cinnéide.

Placenames such as Killokennedy in Thomond are indicative of their longstanding presence in the region.

History
The Kennedys belonged to the powerful Dál gCais people of Thomond, headed by the O'Briens. They resided in far eastern Clare, northern Limerick, Mayo, and northern Tipperary in an area called Ormond. Originally seated in Glemor, near Killaloe in Co. Clare, they migrated across the river Shannon to Ormond in Co. Tipperary following pressure from other septs in the region (mainly the O'Briens and the McNamaras) in the 12th century. They soon grew in power to become lords in Ormond from the 11th to 16th centuries. The Annals of the Four Masters described them in 1300 to be "the undisputed Lords of Ormond".

Placenames such as Coolkennedy and Garrykennedy in Upper Ormond and Killokennedy in Thomond are indicative of their longstanding presence in the region.

St Ruadhan of Lorrha was the special protector of the Kennedys of Ormond. Around 1600, a branch of the sept migrated to Co. Antrim where many Kennedys are still found today.

According to Daithi O'hOgain (Associate Professor at University College Dublin), there is a lineage of Irish Kennedys descended directly from Brian Boru: "The name Cinneide also continued in the direct O'Brien line. For instance, a branch of the family descended from King Donnchadh, son of Brian Boru, settled in Aherloe in south Tipperary, one section of which had the name Cinneide as a surname. Another Cinneide O'Briain, grandson of the same Donnchadh, was a strong opponent of his kinsman, King Toirdhealbhach, and on this account he was assisted by the Connacht king, Aedh O'Ruairc of Breffny, to set up a kingdom of his own on the Meath-Cavan border. This little kingdom was broken up by Toirdhealbhach's army in 1080, and Cinneide O'Briain himself was slain in 1084 at the Battle of Monecronock, near Leixlip in Count Kildare. The connection with the O'Rourkes of Breffny did not end, however, for people bearing the name Cinneide settled in that area of County Leitrim. These were known by the synonym Muimhneach ("Munster-man"), which is anglicised as the surnames Mimnagh and Minnagh."

To add to the confusion, there are the Kennedys of nine-county Ulster in the north of Ireland. Many Scottish Kennedys were planters in Ulster, and many Scots went south to Dublin and mingled with the Irish clan.

In the aftermath of the Black Death, there was a Gaelic resurgence in Ireland as the plague more heavily hit the Normans in the urbanised areas. The main rivals of the O'Kennedys were the Norman-descended Butlers who were Earls of Ormond (a title of the Lordship of Ireland).  The two families signed a peace treaty in 1336, followed by another in 1347. The latter was broke when the O'Kennedys, with their Irish allies, the O'Briens and O'Carrolls, attacked and burned Nenagh. The O'Kennedys were able to use the Butler–FitzGerald dispute to attack the Butlers whenever they were overstretched by attacks from the Earl of Desmond. The O'Kennedys and their native Irish allies were able to drive the Butler dynasty out from Nenagh Castle in 1391 and set themselves up there (these Butlers moved out to Kilkenny Castle).

Castles

The Kennedys' castles in Ireland were all located near Nenagh in County Tipperary. The following castles were built by, or held by the Kennedys:

Ballintotty Castle
Ballycapple Castle
Dromineer Castle
Garrykennedy Castle
Lackeen Castle
Nenagh Castle
 Knigh Castle
 Urra Castle
 Ballyartella Castle

As well as this there were castles at Glenahilty, Kilmochnage, Bawndownmore, Carrigichonigrick, Swyffine, Beallachavvine, Ballingarry, Lackeen, Ballycappel, Annagh, Ballaghfymoye, Ballyquirke, Kilcarron, Rathurles, Dunally and Castle Otway.

Arms
Sable three helmets in profile Argent.

References

Bibliography

 Callanan, Martin (1938) Records of four Tipperary septs: the O'Kennedys, O'Dwyers, O'Mulryans, O'Meaghers

External links 
 The Decline of the O'Kennedys of Ormond by County Tipperary Historical Society
Clan Kennedy: Of Presidents and Kings at IrishAmerica.com
O'Kennedy family pedigree at Library Ireland

Septs of the Dál gCais
Kennedy